5th Anniversary Super Live Give Me Ten!!!!! is a video album released by Japanese rock unit Superfly. It is the group's fifth video album and features content from their March and April 2013 arena tour of the same name's stop at the Saitama Super Arena. The limited edition contains a second disc with the music videos for the new songs from fifth anniversary album Superfly Best.

Track listing

References

External links
Give Me Ten!!!!! on Superfly-Web.com

2013 live albums
Superfly (band) albums
Live albums by Japanese artists
2013 video albums
Live video albums
Albums recorded at Saitama Super Arena